Carr Township is one of six townships in Durham County, North Carolina, United States. The township had a population of 2,441 according to the 2010 census.

Geographically, Carr Township occupies  in eastern Durham County.  The township is occupied by small portions of the city of Falls Lake.  The township was formerly part of Cedar Fork Township in Wake County but was created in a 1911 transfer to Durham County along with parts of Oak Grove Township.

References 

Townships in Durham County, North Carolina
Townships in North Carolina
Populated places established in 1911
1911 establishments in North Carolina